tert-Butylhydroquinone (TBHQ, tertiary butylhydroquinone) is a synthetic aromatic organic compound which is a type of phenol. It is a derivative of hydroquinone, substituted with a tert-butyl group.

Applications

Food preservative
In foods, TBHQ is used as a preservative for unsaturated vegetable oils and many edible animal fats. It does not cause discoloration even in the presence of iron, and does not change flavor or odor of the material to which it is added. It can be combined with other preservatives such as butylated hydroxyanisole (BHA). As a food additive, its E number is E319.  It is added to a wide range of foods.  Its primary advantage is extending storage life.

Other
In perfumery, it is used as a fixative to lower the evaporation rate and improve stability.

It is used industrially as a stabilizer to inhibit autopolymerization of organic peroxides.

It is used as an antioxidant in biodiesel.

It is also added to varnishes, lacquers, resins, and oil-field additives.

Safety and regulation
The European Food Safety Authority (EFSA) and the United States Food and Drug Administration (FDA) have evaluated TBHQ and determined that it is safe to consume at the concentration allowed in foods.  The FDA and European Union both set an upper limit of 0.02% (200mg/kg) of the oil or fat content in foods. At very high doses, it has some negative health effects on lab animals, such as producing precursors to stomach tumors and damage to DNA.

A number of studies have shown that prolonged exposure to very high doses of TBHQ may be carcinogenic, especially for stomach tumors.  Other studies, however, have shown opposite effects including inhibition against HCA-induced carcinogenesis (by  depression of metabolic activation) for TBHQ and other phenolic antioxidants (TBHQ was one of several, and not the most potent). The EFSA considers TBHQ to be noncarcinogenic.  A 1986 review of scientific literature concerning the toxicity of TBHQ determined that a wide margin of safety exists between the levels of intake by humans and the doses that produce adverse effects in animal studies. There have been reports of vision disturbances in individuals exposed to this chemical.

In addition, TBHQ has been identified by high-throughput screening as having potential immunotoxic effects.

References

Hydroquinones
Food additives
Food antioxidants
Preservatives
Alkylphenols
Tert-butyl compounds
E-number additives